Falmouth Penwerris is an electoral division of Cornwall in the United Kingdom and returns one member to sit on Cornwall Council. The current Councillor is Jayne Kirkham, a Labour and Co-operative member and the leader of the Labour Party group on the council. The current division is distinct from those of the same name used from 2009 to 2013 and from 2013 to 2021, after boundary changes at the 2013 and 2021 local elections.

Councillors

2013-2021

2021-present

2021-present division

Extent
The current division represents the centre and north west of the town of Falmouth, including North Parade, Glasney Road, High Street, Killigrew Street, and Kimberley Park. Falmouth Primary Academy is also part of the division.

Election results

2021 election

2009-2021 division

Extent
Falmouth Penwerris represented the north west of the town of Falmouth, including North Parade, Glasney Road, High Street and Falmouth Primary Academy. The division covered 81 hectares in total.

Election results

2017 election

2013 election

2009 election

Notes

References

Electoral divisions of Cornwall Council
Falmouth, Cornwall